Austria's Next Topmodel, season 7, (stylized as Austria's Next Topmodel boysןɹıƃ) was the seventh season of the Austrian reality television show in which a number of men and women compete for the title of Austria's Next Topmodel and a chance to start their career in the modelling industry. The winner, depending on gender, will also be given the chance to appear on the cover of the Austrian edition of either Men's Health or Women's Health magazine. The social media scoring system was still implemented this season.

The winner of the competition was 19-year-old Fabian Herzgsell from Salzburg. As his prizes, he received a contract with Vienna-based modeling agency Wiener Models, a cover of Men's Health magazine, a position as the face of Tezenis underwear and a Ford Fiesta.

Contestants

Episodes

Episode 1
Original airdate: 

Granted immunity by the public: Maximilliano Mantovani 
Nominated for elimination by the public: Melisa Sretkovic	
Nominated for elimination by the judges: Felix Schiller, Johannes Spilka & Katja Peterka 	 	
Eliminated: Johannes Spilka

Episode 2
Original Airdate: 

Immune from elimination: Katja Peterka
Granted immunity by the public: Lukas Krammer
Nominated for elimination by the public: Melisa Sretkovic
Nominated for elimination by the judges: Bernhard Stich, Felix Schiller & Nicole Fried
Eliminated: Felix Schiller

Episode 3
Original Airdate: 

Challenge winner: Gloria Burtscher
Booked for casting: Angelina Stolz, Bernhard Stich, Fabian Herzgsell, Gloria Burtscher, Katja Peterka & Patrick Treffer
Immune from elimination: Bernhard Stich
Granted immunity by the public: Lukas Krammer
Quit: Lukas Krammer
Nominated for elimination by the public: Jelena Vujcic
Nominated for elimination by the judges: Benedikt Cekolj, Junel Anderson & Maximilliano Mantovani
Eliminated: Jelena Vujcic

Episode 4
Original Airdate: 

Booked for job: Adrian Oshioke & Tassilo Herberstein
Immune from elimination: Bernhard Stich
Granted immunity by the public: Fabian Herzgsell
Nominated for elimination by the public: Junel Anderson
Nominated for elimination by the judges: Alexandra Kröpfl, Bianca Konarzewski & Nicole Fried
Eliminated: Alexandra Kröpfl

Episode 5
Original Airdate: 

Booked for campaign: Adrian Oshioke, Bianca Konarzewski & Katja Peterka
Challenge winner: Mia Sabathy
Granted immunity by the public: Adrian Oshioke
Nominated for elimination by the public: Mia Sabathy
Nominated for elimination by the judges: Benedikt Cekolj, Junel Anderson & Maximilliano Mantovani
Eliminated: Benedikt Cekolj

Episode 6
Original Airdate: 

Granted immunity by the public: Melisa Sretkovic
Nominated for elimination by the contestants: Nicole Fried 
Nominated for elimination by the judges: Adrian Oshioke, Bernhard Stich & Junel Anderson
Eliminated: None

Episode 7
Original Airdate: 

Eliminated outside of judging panel: Adrian Oshioke
Challenge winner: Junel Anderson
Granted immunity by the public: Nicole Fried
Nominated for elimination by the public: Angelina Stolz
Nominated for elimination by the judges: Bernhard Stich, Bianca Konarzewski & Maximilliano Mantovani
Eliminated: Bernhard Stich & Bianca Konarzewski

Episode 8
Original Airdate: 

Challenge winner:  Mia Sabathy 
Immune from elimination: Gloria Burtscher
Granted immunity by the public: Fabian Herzgsell
Nominated for elimination by the public: Melisa Sretkovic
Nominated for elimination by the judges: Junel Anderson, Nicole Fried & Patrick Treffer
Eliminated: Junel Anderson

Episode 9
Original Airdate: 

Challenge winner: Fabian Herzgsell
Booked for job: Angelina Stolz
Immune from elimination: Angelina Stolz
Granted immunity by the public: Katja Peterka 
Eliminated: None

Episode 10
Original Airdate: 

Challenge winner: Maximilliano Mantovani
Booked for job: Fabian Herzgsell, Katja Peterka, Melisa Sretkovic & Patrick Treffer 
Eliminated: Nicole Fried
Returned: Bernhard Stich

Episode 11
Original Airdate: 

Challenge winner: Bernhard Stich
Booked for castings: Angelina Stolz, Fabian Herzgsell & Katja Peterka 
Granted immunity by the public: Patrick Treffer 
Nominated for elimination by the public: Gloria Burtscher
Nominated for elimination by the judges: Katja Peterka, Maximilliano Mantovani & Melisa Sretkovic
Eliminated: Maximilliano Mantovani

Episode 12
Original Airdate: 

Challenge winner: Bernhard Stich & Mia Sabathy
Booked for job: Angelina Stolz, Mia Sabathy & Tassilo Herberstein
Nominated for elimination by the judges: Angelina Stolz, Fabian Herzgsell, Katja Peterka, Melisa Sretkovic & Tassilo Herberstein
Eliminated: Katja Peterka

Episode 13
Original Airdate: 

Challenge winner: Melisa Sretkovic
Booked for job: Angelina Stolz, Fabian Herzgsell & Mia Sabathy
Granted immunity by the public: Patrick Treffer
Nominated for elimination by the public: Gloria Burtscher
Nominated for elimination by the judges: Bernhard Stich, Melisa Sretkovic & Tassilo Herberstein
Eliminated: Tassilo Herberstein
Returned: Maximilliano Mantovani

Episode 14
Original Airdate: 

Challenge winner: Patrick Treffer
Booked for job: Angelina Stolz, Fabian Herzgsell, Maximilliano Mantovani & Melisa Sretkovic
Eliminated: Patrick Treffer

Episode 15
Original Airdate: 

Quit: Maximilliano Mantovani
Returned: Tassilo Herberstein
Challenge winner: Angelina Stolz
Booked for job: Angelina Stolz,  Mia Sabathy & Tassilo Herberstein
Immune: Mia Sabathy
Bottom two: Bernhard Stich & Gloria Burtscher
Eliminated: None
Special guest: Sami Slimani

Episode 16
Original Airdate: 

Challenge winner: None
Booked for job: Angelina Stolz, Bernhard Stich, Fabian Herzgsell, Gloria Burtscher, Melisa Sretkovic, Mia Sabathy & Tassilo Herberstein
Bottom three: Bernhard Stich, Fabian Herzgsell & Melisa Sretkovic
Eliminated: Bernhard Stich

Episode 17
Original Airdate: 

Challenge winner: Fabian Herzgsell
Booked for job: Angelina Stolz, Gloria Burtscher & Melisa Sretkovic 
Bottom three: Angelina Stolz, Melisa Sretkovic & Tassilo Herberstein
Eliminated: None

Episode 18
Original Airdate: 

Challenge winner: Fabian Herzgsell
Booked for job: Gloria Burtscher
Eliminated outside of judging panel: Melisa Sretkovic
Immune from elimination: Mia Sabathy
Bottom two: Gloria Burtscher & Tassilo Herberstein
Eliminated: Tassilo Herberstein

Episode 19
Original Airdate: 

Final four: Angelina Stolz, Fabian Herzgsell, Gloria Burtscher & Mia Sabathy
Eliminated: Gloria Burtscher
Final three: Angelina Stolz, Fabian Herzgsell & Mia Sabathy
Eliminated: Mia Sabathy
Final two: Angelina Stolz & Fabian Herzgsell
Austria's Next Topmodel: Fabian Herzgsell

Summaries

 
 The contestant was eliminated outside of judging panel
 The contestant quit the competition
 The contestant was immune from elimination
 The contestant was in danger of elimination
 The contestant was eliminated
 The contestant won the competition

Photo shoot guide
Episode 1 photo shoot: Empress Elisabeth & Franz Joseph I portraits
Episode 2 photo shoot: Posing with horses in B&W
Episode 3 photo shoot: Couples on a boat
Episode 4 photo shoot: Topless with babies in B&W
Episode 5 photo shoot: Action jump inside a hangar
Episode 6 photo shoot: Traditional wear in Marrakesh with snakes
Episode 7 photo shoot: Oriental beauty in a pool
Episode 8 photo shoot: Kaftans and turbans in the desert
Episode 9 photo shoot: James Bond action on a train
Episode 10 photo shoot: Posing on barrels of wine
Episode 11 photo shoot: Androgyny
Episode 12 photo shoot: Fire runway show
Episode 13 photo shoot: Romeo & Juliet
Episode 14 photo shoot: Men's Health & Women's Health magazine covers
Episode 16 photo shoots: Dancing lions; Stylesfeed; Bamboo editorial; Esquire magazine; Jessica magazine
Episode 18 photo shoot: Posing in giant bowls of soup
Episode 19 photo shoot: Masquerade couture full body & beauty shots

Judges
Melanie Scheriau (Host)
Papis Loveday
Michael Urban

References

External links
 Official website

Austria's Next Topmodel
2010s Austrian television series
2015 Austrian television seasons
German-language television shows
2016 Austrian television seasons
Television shows filmed in Austria
Television shows filmed in Morocco
Television shows filmed in Italy
Television shows filmed in Germany
Television shows filmed in Spain
Television shows filmed in Hong Kong
Television shows filmed in Monaco